Raniganj is a tehsil in Pratapgarh district, Uttar Pradesh, India. It has a police station. It is represented by the Raniganj Uttar Pradesh Assembly constituency.

Villages 
, the tehsil contains the following 302 villages:

 Almapur
 Amapur Bori
 Amari
 Amarpur
 Amli Dandh
 Arar
 Ashapur
 Ashipur
 Atri
 Audhanpur
 Auwar
 Babu Patti
 Baghevra
 Bairampur
 Bakulahi
 Balipur
 Banrahi
 Banvapur
 Banvarpur
 Barahda
 Barahimpur
 Barsanda
 Basant Patti
 Basha
 Basi
 Basi Adhar Ganj
 Basiraha
 Basirpur
 Baudh Patti
 Beerapur
 Behdaul Kala
 Behdaul Khurd
 Bhabhuvar
 Bhagesara
 Bhagipur
 Bhagwanpur Mufrid
 Bhaidaspur
 Bhaisauna
 Bhat Purwa
 Bhavani Garh
 Bhiti
 Bhojeymau
 Bhuidaha
 Bhujaini
 Bhusalpur
 Bichhur
 Bijemau
 Bikhanapur
 Biraipur
 Biraipur
 Bisambharpur
 Bisunpur Dariyapur
 Bisunpur Kala
 Bithalpur
 Bithalpur- 2
 Borra
 Budha Kumbhapur
 Chaghaipur
 Chaksara
 Chalakpur Bad Farosan
 Chalakpur Kurmiyan
 Chandelepur
 Chandi Patti
 Chandipur Govindpur
 Chandpur
 Chaubey Patti
 Chhanapur
 Chheetpur
 Chhitpalgarh
 Dadupur Mufarid
 Daherkala
 Dahery Khurd
 Daipur Adharganj
 Damdam
 Dariyapur (159666)
 Dariyapur (159693)
 Dauarikapur
 Dayalpur
 Delhupur
 Deva Garh Kamasin
 Devalaha
 Dewasa
 Dhanaupur
 Dhanuha
 Dhanvantari Patti
 Dhari
 Dhorka Mukrid
 Dighvat
 Dileeppur
 Divaini
 Dube Patti Ram Karan
 Dwarikapur
 Fatanpur
 Fatehpur Dariyapur
 Gaiapur
 Gambherpur Patti
 Ganai Dheeh
 Gaura Purey Badal
 Gavan Pati
 Ghatampur
 Ghorka Talukdari
 Gobardhanpur
 Gokula
 Gopalpur
 Gopalpur Mufrid
 Gulra
 Gyanpur
 Halamai
 Harinathpur
 Harparmau
 Harpur Soudh
 Hathaura Sarai
 Hathethi
 Himayunpur
 Husenpur
 Jaddupur
 Jagatpur
 Jagdishpur (159682)
 Jagdishpur (159716)
 Jairampur
 Jajapur
 Jamtali
 Jamunipur
 Jamuri
 Jariyari
 Jolhapur
 Kadipur
 Kahla
 Kaili Deeh
 Kali Muradpur
 Kalyani
 Kamasin
 Kanevra Purey Khushali
 Karka
 Kaseruva
 Kathindra
 Katrauli
 Kaulapur
 Kaulapur Nand Patti
 Kayasth Patti
 Kevara Kala
 Kevara Khurd
 Khakhapur
 Khalispur
 Khampur Dubey Patti
 Khar-Har
 Kharagpur
 Kharwanie
 Khemaipur
 Khushal Garh
 Kodar Deeh
 Kothhara
 Kothiyari
 Koyam
 Krmajeetpur
 Kura Deeh
 Kusfara
 Lachhipur
 Lapkan
 Lohar Tara
 Madhavapur
 Mah Devari
 Mahothari
 Makari
 Makwan
 Malhi
 Malhupur
 Mana Patti
 Manha Kalipur
 Manpur
 Manpur Pasiya
 Masauli
 Mathura
 Mau
 Medhauli Kala
 Medhauli Khurd
 Meerpur
 Meruva Deeh
 Mirjapur
 Mishrudeenpur
 Mohammadpur
 Muar Adhar Ganj
 Nabhapur
 Naharpur
 Nai Koat
 Najiyapur
 Namaksayar
 Narainpur Kala
 Narainpur Khurd
 Narharpur
 Nari
 Narsinghpur
 Naseerpur
 Nasirpur
 Naubasta
 Naudera
 Navhar Husenpur
 Nidhi Patti
 Nirbhay Patti
 Pacharas
 Padhva
 Pali
 Parasrampur
 Pareytara
 Parsa Mau
 Pathari Kala
 Pathariya Khurd
 Pipari
 Prajapatipur
 Premdhar Patti
 Pupipur
 Puranpur Pathkhan
 Pure Goliya
 Pure Hiraman
 Pure Lal Pandey
 Pure Mohan
 Pure Tula
 Purela
 Purey Basau
 Purey Bhaiyaji
 Purey Bhogi
 Purey Bichhur
 Purey Chandan
 Purey Charan
 Purey Dukhan
 Purey Gangaram
 Purey Ghanshyam
 Purey Gosain
 Purey Gosay
 Purey Harsan
 Purey Khararai
 Purey Mahanth
 Purey Panday
 Purey Ram Sahaya
 Purey Saval
 Purey Shekhi
 Raghwapur
 Rahetu Rampur
 Rainipur Sakhariya
 Raipur
 Rajapur
 Rajapur Deva Patti
 Rajapur Kharhar
 Rakha
 Ram Nagar
 Ramapur
 Ramdava Patti
 Ramgarh
 Rampur Adharganj
 Rastipur
 Rasuiya
 Ratanmai
 Risal Garh
 Rohakala Khurd
 Sadhauli
 Sahajvar
 Sahpur
 Sandaura
 Sandh
 Sandila
 Sansaripur
 Sansarpur (159562) 
 Sansarpur (159763)
 Sarai Bharat Rai
 Sarai Jamuni
 Sarai Raja
 Sarai Ratau
 Sarai Santram
 Sarai Sher Khan
 Sarai Sultani
 Saray Ganai
 Saray Nakar
 Sarbanka Purva
 Savaiya
 Shekhupur
 Shiv Garh
 Shivgarh
 Shivsat
 Sigahi
 Sighati Khalsa
 Silaudhi
 Sipahmaheri
 Sirnathpur
 Sripur
 Sujanpur
 Sujha
 Sultanpur
 Surva Misirpur
 Suvansa
 Tandwa
 Tardeeh
 Taroi Deeh
 Tavankalpur
 Thahipur
 Thariya
 Tikaita
 Titihiriya Dand
 Tiwaripur (159680)
 Tiwaripur (159753)
 Todar Patti
 Tulsipur
 Ugaipur

References

External links 
 

 

 

Pratapgarh district, Uttar Pradesh